Secondary Music School in Tuzla is a Public Institution music school in Tuzla, Bosnia and Herzegovina, established in 1957.

History

Foundation and early years 
Tuzla Music School was founded by the decision of the People's Committee of the Municipality of Tuzla on February 22, 1957. 
The founders were Čestmír Mirko Dušek and Dubravko Jurić.

Recent history 

In 2017, the school changed its name to High School of Music Čestmir Mirko Dušek Tuzla.

Today the school is attended by about 120 students, studying: piano, accordion, flute, violin, guitar, and clarinet. The school also operates a mixed choir and an accordion orchestra.

The school hosts a semi-annual concert in Tuzla, as well as numerous solo performances of students, and other cultural events.

Departments

 Music theory Department / General Department
 Instrumental Department for accordion
 Instrumental Department for guitar
 Instrumental Department for piano
 Instrumental Department for violin
 Instrumental Department for flute
 Instrumental Department for clarinet

Degrees offered

 Musician general
 Musician accordionist
 Musician guitarist
 Musician pianist
 Musician violinist
 Musician flutist
 Musician clarinetist

Notable students 

 Denis Azabagić
 Nihad Hrustanbegovic
 Emir Vildić
 Vladimir Valjarević
 Dženana Šehanović

References

External links 
 

Education in Tuzla
Buildings and structures in Tuzla
Educational institutions established in 1957
Music schools in Bosnia and Herzegovina
1957 establishments in Yugoslavia